This is a list of the bird species recorded in Sweden. The avifauna of Sweden included a total of 553 confirmed species as of October 2022, according to BirdLife Sveriges (BLS) with supplemental additions from Avibase. Of them, one has been introduced by humans. One is extinct. This list does not include species whose origin (whether wild or human-assisted) is not known.

This list's taxonomic treatment (designation and sequence of orders, families and species) and nomenclature (English and scientific names) are those of The Clements Checklist of Birds of the World, 2022 edition. The Swedish names in parentheses are from the BirdLife Sveriges list.

The following tags have been used to highlight some categories of occurrence.

(A) Accidental - a species that has occurred fewer than 100 times in Sweden
(I) Introduced - a species introduced to Sweden as a consequence, direct or indirect, of human actions, and has become established

Ducks, geese, and waterfowl
Order: AnseriformesFamily: Anatidae

Anatidae includes the ducks and most duck-like waterfowl, such as geese and swans. These birds are adapted to an aquatic existence with webbed feet, flattened bills, and feathers that are excellent at shedding water due to an oily coating.

 Bar-headed goose, Anser indicus (A)
 Graylag goose, Anser anser
 Greater white-fronted goose, Anser albifrons
 Lesser white-fronted goose, Anser erythropus
 Taiga bean-goose, Anser fabalis
 Tundra bean-goose, Anser serrirostris
 Pink-footed goose, Anser brachyrhynchus
 Brant, Branta bernicla
 Barnacle goose, Branta leucopsis
 Cackling goose, Branta hutchinsii (A)
 Canada goose, Branta canadensis (I)
 Red-breasted goose, Branta ruficollis
 Mute swan, Cygnus olor
 Tundra swan, Cygnus columbianus
 Whooper swan, Cygnus cygnus
 Egyptian goose, Alopochen aegyptiaca (A)
 Ruddy shelduck, Tadorna ferruginea
 Common shelduck, Tadorna tadorna
 Garganey, Spatula querquedula
 Blue-winged teal, Spatula discors (A)
 Northern shoveler, Spatula clypeata
 Gadwall, Mareca strepera
 Eurasian wigeon, Mareca penelope
 American wigeon, Mareca americana (A)
 Mallard, Anas platyrhynchos
 American black duck, Anas rubripes (A)
 Northern pintail, Anas acuta
 Green-winged teal, Anas crecca
 Red-crested pochard, Netta rufina
 Common pochard, Aythya ferina
 Ring-necked duck, Aythya collaris (A)
 Ferruginous duck, Aythya nyroca (A)
 Tufted duck, Aythya fuligula
 Greater scaup, Aythya marila
 Lesser scaup, Aythya affinis (A)
 Steller's eider, Polysticta stelleri (A)
 King eider, Somateria spectabilis
 Common eider, Somateria mollissima
 Harlequin duck, Histrionicus histrionicus (A)
 Surf scoter, Melanitta perspicillata
 Velvet scoter, Melanitta fusca
 White-winged scoter, Melanitta deglandi (A)
 Stejneger's scoter, Melanitta stejnegeri (A)
 Common scoter, Melanitta nigra
 Black scoter, Melanitta americana (A)
 Long-tailed duck, Clangula hyemalis
 Common goldeneye, Bucephala clangula
 Smew, Mergellus albellus
 Common merganser, Mergus merganser
 Red-breasted merganser, Mergus serrator
 Ruddy duck, Oxyura jamaicensis (A)
 White-headed duck, Oxyura leucocephala (A)

Pheasants, grouse, and allies
Order: GalliformesFamily: Phasianidae

These are terrestrial species of gamebirds, feeding and nesting on the ground. They are variable in size but generally plump, with broad and relatively short wings.

 Hazel grouse, Tetrastes bonasia
 Willow ptarmigan, Lagopus lagopus
 Rock ptarmigan, Lagopus muta
 Western capercaillie, Tetrao urogallus
 Black grouse, Lyrurus tetrix
 Gray partridge, Perdix perdix
 Ring-necked pheasant, Phasianus colchicus (I)
 Common quail, Coturnix coturnix

Grebes

Order: PodicipediformesFamily: Podicipedidae

Grebes are small to medium-large freshwater diving birds. They have lobed toes and are excellent swimmers and divers. However, they have their feet placed far back on the body, making them quite ungainly on land.

 Little grebe, Tachybaptus ruficollis
 Horned grebe, Podiceps auritus
 Red-necked grebe, Podiceps grisegena
 Great crested grebe, Podiceps cristatus
 Eared grebe, Podiceps nigricollis

Pigeons and doves

Order: ColumbiformesFamily: Columbidae

Pigeons and doves are stout-bodied birds with short necks and short slender bills with a fleshy cere.

 Rock pigeon, Columba livia (I)
 Stock dove, Columba oenas
 Common wood-pigeon, Columba palumbus
 European turtle-dove, Streptopelia turtur
 Oriental turtle-dove, Streptopelia orientalis (A)
 Eurasian collared-dove, Streptopelia decaocto
 Mourning dove, Zenaida macroura (A)

Sandgrouse
Order: PterocliformesFamily: Pteroclidae

Sandgrouse have small pigeon-like heads and necks, but sturdy compact bodies. They have long pointed wings and sometimes tails and a fast direct flight. Flocks fly to watering holes at dawn and dusk. Their legs are feathered down to the toes.

 Pallas's sandgrouse, Syrrhaptes paradoxus (A)

Bustards
Order: OtidiformesFamily: Otididae

Bustards are large terrestrial birds mainly associated with dry open country and steppes in the Old World. They are omnivorous and nest on the ground. They walk steadily on strong legs and big toes, pecking for food as they go. They have long broad wings with "fingered" wingtips and striking patterns in flight. Many have interesting mating displays.

 Great bustard, Otis tarda (A)
 Macqueen's bustard, Chlamydotis macqueenii (A)
 Little bustard, Tetrax tetrax (A)

Cuckoos
Order: CuculiformesFamily: Cuculidae

The family Cuculidae includes cuckoos, roadrunners, and anis. These birds are of variable size with slender bodies, long tails, and strong legs. The Old World cuckoos are brood parasites.

 Great spotted cuckoo, Clamator glandarius (A)
 Common cuckoo, Cuculus canorus

Nightjars and allies
Order: CaprimulgiformesFamily: Caprimulgidae

Nightjars are medium-sized nocturnal birds that usually nest on the ground. They have long wings, short legs, and very short bills. Most have small feet, of little use for walking, and long pointed wings. Their soft plumage is camouflaged to resemble bark or leaves.

 Eurasian nightjar, Caprimulgus europaeus
 Egyptian nightjar, Caprimulgus aegyptius (A)

Swifts
Order: CaprimulgiformesFamily: Apodidae

Swifts are small birds which spend the majority of their lives flying. These birds have very short legs and never settle voluntarily on the ground, perching instead only on vertical surfaces. Many swifts have long swept-back wings which resemble a crescent or boomerang.

 Chimney swift, Chaetura pelagica (A)
 White-throated needletail, Hirundapus caudacutus (A)
 Alpine swift, Apus melba (A)
 Common swift, Apus apus
 Pallid swift, Apus pallidus (A)
 Pacific swift, Apus pacificus (A)
 Little swift, Apus affinis (A)
 White-rumped swift, Apus caffer (A)

Rails, gallinules, and coots

Order: GruiformesFamily: Rallidae

Rallidae is a large family of small to medium-sized birds which includes the rails, crakes, coots, and gallinules. Typically they inhabit dense vegetation in damp environments near lakes, swamps, or rivers. In general they are shy and secretive birds, making them difficult to observe. Most species have strong legs and long toes which are well adapted to soft uneven surfaces. They tend to have short, rounded wings and to be weak fliers.

 Water rail, Rallus aquaticus
 Corn crake, Crex crex
 Sora, Porzana carolina (A)
 Spotted crake, Porzana porzana
 Eurasian moorhen, Gallinula chloropus
 Eurasian coot, Fulica atra
 Little crake, Zapornia parva
 Baillon's crake, Zapornia pusilla (A)

Cranes

Order: GruiformesFamily: Gruidae

Cranes are large, long-legged, and long-necked birds. Unlike the similar-looking but unrelated herons, cranes fly with necks outstretched, not pulled back. Most have elaborate and noisy courting displays or "dances".

 Demoiselle crane, Anthropoides virgo (A)
 Sandhill crane, Antigone canadensis (A)
 Common crane, Grus grus

Thick-knees
Order: CharadriiformesFamily: Burhinidae

The thick-knees are a group of waders found worldwide within the tropical zone, with some species also breeding in temperate Europe and Australia. They are medium to large waders with strong black or yellow-black bills, large yellow eyes, and cryptic plumage. Despite being classed as waders, most species have a preference for arid or semi-arid habitats.

 Eurasian thick-knee, Burhinus oedicnemus (A)

Stilts and avocets
Order: CharadriiformesFamily: Recurvirostridae

Recurvirostridae is a family of large wading birds which includes the avocets and stilts. The avocets have long legs and long up-curved bills. The stilts have extremely long legs and long, thin, straight bills.

 Black-winged stilt, Himantopus himantopus (A)
 Pied avocet, Recurvirostra avosetta

Oystercatchers
Order: CharadriiformesFamily: Haematopodidae

The oystercatchers are large and noisy plover-like birds, with strong bills used for smashing or prising open molluscs.

 Eurasian oystercatcher, Haematopus ostralegus

Plovers and lapwings

Order: CharadriiformesFamily: Charadriidae

The family Charadriidae includes the plovers, dotterels, and lapwings. They are small to medium-sized birds with compact bodies, short thick necks, and long, usually pointed, wings. They are found in open country worldwide, mostly in habitats near water.

 Black-bellied plover, Pluvialis squatarola
 European golden-plover, Pluvialis apricaria
 American golden-plover, Pluvialis dominica (A)
 Pacific golden-plover, Pluvialis fulva (A)
 Northern lapwing, Vanellus vanellus
 Gray-headed lapwing, Vanellus cinereus (A)
 Sociable lapwing, Vanellus gregarius (A)
 White-tailed lapwing, Vanellus leucurus (A)
 Lesser sand-plover, Charadrius mongolus (A)
 Greater sand-plover, Charadrius leschenaultii (A)
 Caspian plover, Charadrius asiaticus (A)
 Kentish plover, Charadrius alexandrinus
 Common ringed plover, Charadrius hiaticula
 Little ringed plover, Charadrius dubius
 Killdeer, Charadrius vociferus (A)
 Oriental plover, Charadrius veredus (A)
 Eurasian dotterel, Charadrius morinellus

Sandpipers and allies

Order: CharadriiformesFamily: Scolopacidae

Scolopacidae is a large diverse family of small to medium-sized shorebirds including the sandpipers, curlews, godwits, shanks, tattlers, woodcocks, snipes, dowitchers, and phalaropes. The majority of these species eat small invertebrates picked out of the mud or soil. Variation in length of legs and bills enables multiple species to feed in the same habitat, particularly on the coast, without direct competition for food.

 Upland sandpiper, Bartramia longicauda (A)
 Whimbrel, Numenius phaeopus
 Little curlew, Numenius minutus (A)
 Eurasian curlew, Numenius arquata
 Bar-tailed godwit, Limosa lapponica
 Black-tailed godwit, Limosa limosa
 Hudsonian godwit, Limosa haemastica (A)
 Ruddy turnstone, Arenaria interpres
 Great knot, Calidris tenuirostris (A)
 Red knot, Calidris canutus
 Ruff, Calidris pugnax
 Broad-billed sandpiper, Calidris falcinellus
 Sharp-tailed sandpiper, Calidris acuminata (A)
 Stilt sandpiper, Calidris himantopus (A)
 Curlew sandpiper, Calidris ferruginea
 Temminck's stint, Calidris temminckii
 Long-toed stint, Calidris subminuta (A)
 Red-necked stint, Calidris ruficollis (A)
 Sanderling, Calidris alba
 Dunlin, Calidris alpina
 Purple sandpiper, Calidris maritima
 Baird's sandpiper, Calidris bairdii (A)
 Little stint, Calidris minuta
 Least sandpiper, Calidris minutilla (A)
 White-rumped sandpiper, Calidris fuscicollis (A)
 Buff-breasted sandpiper, Calidris subruficollis
 Pectoral sandpiper, Calidris melanotos
 Semipalmated sandpiper, Calidris pusilla (A)
 Western sandpiper, Calidris mauri (A)
 Short-billed dowitcher, Limnodromus griseus (A)
 Long-billed dowitcher, Limnodromus scolopaceus (A)
 Jack snipe, Lymnocryptes minimus
 Eurasian woodcock, Scolopax rusticola
 Great snipe, Gallinago media
 Common snipe, Gallinago gallinago
 Wilson's snipe, Gallinago delicata (A)
 Terek sandpiper, Xenus cinereus
 Wilson's phalarope, Phalaropus tricolor (A)
 Red-necked phalarope, Phalaropus lobatus
 Red phalarope, Phalaropus fulicarius
 Common sandpiper, Actitis hypoleucos
 Spotted sandpiper, Actitis macularius (A)
 Green sandpiper, Tringa ochropus
 Solitary sandpiper, Tringa solitaria (A)
 Gray-tailed tattler, Tringa brevipes (A)
 Spotted redshank, Tringa erythropus
 Greater yellowlegs, Tringa melanoleuca (A)
 Common greenshank, Tringa nebularia
 Lesser yellowlegs, Tringa flavipes (A)
 Marsh sandpiper, Tringa stagnatilis
 Wood sandpiper, Tringa glareola
 Common redshank, Tringa totanus

Pratincoles and coursers
Order: CharadriiformesFamily: Glareolidae

Glareolidae is a family of wading birds comprising the pratincoles, which have short legs, long pointed wings, and long forked tails, and the coursers, which have long legs, short wings, and long, pointed bills which curve downwards.

 Cream-colored courser, Cursorius cursor (A)
 Collared pratincole, Glareola pratincola (A)
 Oriental pratincole, Glareola maldivarum (A)
 Black-winged pratincole, Glareola nordmanni (A)

Skuas and jaegers
Order: CharadriiformesFamily: Stercorariidae

The family Stercorariidae are, in general, medium to large sea birds, typically with gray or brown plumage, often with white markings on the wings. They nest on the ground in temperate and arctic regions and are long-distance migrants.

 Great skua, Stercorarius skua
 Pomarine jaeger, Stercorarius pomarinus
 Parasitic jaeger, Stercorarius parasiticus
 Long-tailed jaeger, Stercorarius longicaudus

Auks, murres, and puffins

Order: CharadriiformesFamily: Alcidae

Alcidae are a family of seabirds which are superficially similar to penguins with their black-and-white colors, their upright posture, and some of their habits, but which are able to fly.

 Dovekie, Alle alle
 Common murre, Uria aalge
 Thick-billed murre, Uria lomvia (A)
 Razorbill, Alca torda
 Great auk, Pinguinus impennis (A) (extinct)
 Black guillemot, Cepphus grylle
 Parakeet auklet, Aethia psittacula (A)
 Atlantic puffin, Fratercula arctica
 Tufted puffin, Fratercula cirrhata (A)

Gulls, terns, and skimmers

Order: CharadriiformesFamily: Laridae

Laridae is a family of medium to large seabirds and includes gulls, terns, and skimmers. Gulls are typically gray or white, often with black markings on the head or wings. They have stout, longish, bills and webbed feet. Terns are a group of generally medium to large seabirds typically with gray or white plumage, often with black markings on the head. Most terns hunt fish by diving but some pick insects off the surface of fresh water. Terns are generally long-lived birds, with several species known to live in excess of 30 years.

 Black-legged kittiwake, Rissa tridactyla
 Ivory gull, Pagophila eburnea (A)
 Sabine's gull, Xema sabini
 Slender-billed gull, Chroicocephalus genei (A)
 Bonaparte's gull, Chroicocephalus philadelphia (A)
 Black-headed gull, Chroicocephalus ridibundus
 Little gull, Hydrocoloeus minutus
 Ross's gull, Rhodostethia rosea (A)
 Laughing gull, Leucophaeus atricilla (A)
 Franklin's gull, Leucophaeus pipixcan (A)
 Mediterranean gull, Ichthyaetus melanocephalus
 White-eyed gull, Ichthyaetus leucophthalmus (A)
 Pallas's gull, Ichthyaetus ichthyaetus (A)
 Audouin's gull, Ichthyaetus audouinii (A)
 Common gull, Larus canus
 Ring-billed gull, Larus delawarensis (A)
 Herring gull, Larus argentatus
 Yellow-legged gull, Larus michahellis
 Caspian gull, Larus cachinnans
 Iceland gull, Larus glaucoides
 Lesser black-backed gull, Larus fuscus
 Slaty-backed gull, Larus schistisagus (A)
 Glaucous gull, Larus hyperboreus
 Great black-backed gull, Larus marinus
 Sooty tern, Onychoprion fuscatus (A)
 Bridled tern, Onychoprion anaethetus (A)
 Little tern, Sternula albifrons
 Gull-billed tern, Gelochelidon nilotica (A)
 Caspian tern, Hydroprogne caspia
 Black tern, Chlidonias niger
 White-winged tern, Chlidonias leucopterus
 Whiskered tern, Chlidonias hybrida (A)
 Roseate tern, Sterna dougallii (A)
 Common tern, Sterna hirundo
 Arctic tern, Sterna paradisaea
 Forster's tern, Sterna forsteri (A)
 Sandwich tern, Thalasseus sandvicensis

Loons

Order: GaviiformesFamily: Gaviidae

Loons are a group of aquatic birds found in many parts of North America and Northern Europe. They are the size of a large duck or small goose, which they somewhat resemble in shape when swimming, but to which they are completely unrelated. In particular, loons' legs are set very far back which assists swimming underwater but makes walking on land extremely difficult.

 Red-throated loon, Gavia stellata
 Arctic loon, Gavia arctica
 Pacific loon, Gavia pacifica (A)
 Common loon, Gavia immer
 Yellow-billed loon, Gavia adamsii

Albatrosses
Order: ProcellariiformesFamily: Diomedeidae

The albatrosses are among the largest of flying birds, and the great albatrosses of the genus Diomedea have the largest wingspans of any extant birds.

 Yellow-nosed albatross, Thalassarche chlororhynchos (A)
 Black-browed albatross, Thalassarche melanophris (A)

Northern storm-petrels
Order: ProcellariiformesFamily: Hydrobatidae

Though the members of this family are similar in many respects to the southern storm-petrels, including their general appearance and habits, there are enough genetic differences to warrant their placement in a separate family.

 European storm-petrel, Hydrobates pelagicus (A)
 Leach's storm-petrel, Hydrobates leucorhous

Shearwaters and petrels

Order: ProcellariiformesFamily: Procellariidae

The procellariids are the main group of medium-sized "true petrels", characterized by united nostrils with medium septum and a long outer functional primaries.

 Northern fulmar, Fulmarus glacialis
 Fea's petrel, Pterodroma feae (A)
 Cory's shearwater, Caolnectris diomedea (A)
 Great shearwater, Ardenna gravis (A)
 Sooty shearwater, Ardenna griseus
 Manx shearwater, Puffinus puffinus
 Balearic shearwater, Puffinus mauretanicus (A)

Storks
Order: CiconiiformesFamily: Ciconiidae

Storks are large, long-legged, long-necked, wading birds with long, stout bills. Storks are mute, but bill-clattering is an important mode of communication at the nest. Their nests can be large and may be reused for many years. Many species are migratory.

 Black stork, Ciconia nigra
 White stork, Ciconia ciconia

Boobies and gannets
Order: SuliformesFamily: Sulidae

The sulids comprise the gannets and boobies. Both groups are medium-large coastal seabirds that plunge-dive for fish.

 Brown booby, Sula leucogaster (A)
 Northern gannet, Morus bassanus

Cormorants and shags
Order: SuliformesFamily: Phalacrocoracidae

Cormorants and shags are medium-to-large aquatic birds, usually with mainly dark plumage and areas of colored skin on the face. The bill is long, thin and sharply hooked. Their feet are four-toed and webbed.

 Pygmy cormorant, Microcarbo pygmeus (A)
 Great cormorant, Phalacrocorax carbo
 European shag, Gulosus aristotelis

Pelicans
Order: PelecaniformesFamily: Pelecanidae

Pelicans are very large water birds with a distinctive pouch under their beak. Like other birds in the order Pelecaniformes, they have four webbed toes.

 Dalmatian pelican, Pelecanus crispus (A)

Herons, egrets, and bitterns
Order: PelecaniformesFamily: Ardeidae

The family Ardeidae contains the herons, egrets, and bitterns. Herons and egrets are medium to large wading birds with long necks and legs. Bitterns tend to be shorter necked and more secretive. Members of Ardeidae fly with their necks retracted, unlike other long-necked birds such as storks, ibises and spoonbills.

 American bittern, Botaurus lentiginosus (A)
 Great bittern, Botaurus stellaris
 Little bittern, Ixobrychus minutus (A)
 Gray heron, Ardea cinerea
 Purple heron, Ardea purpurea (A)
 Great egret, Ardea alba
 Little egret, Egretta garzetta (A)
 Cattle egret, Bubulcus ibis (A)
 Squacco heron, Ardeola ralloides (A)
 Black-crowned night-heron, Nycticorax nycticorax (A)

Ibises and spoonbills
Order: PelecaniformesFamily: Threskiornithidae

The family Threskiornithidae includes the ibises and spoonbills. They have long, broad wings. Their bodies tend to be elongated, the neck more so, with rather long legs. The bill is also long, decurved in the case of the ibises, straight and distinctively flattened in the spoonbills.

 Glossy ibis, Plegadis falcinellus (A)
 African sacred ibis, Threskiornis aethiopicus (A)
 Eurasian spoonbill, Platalea leucorodia

Osprey
Order: AccipitriformesFamily: Pandionidae

Pandionidae is a family of fish-eating birds of prey, possessing a very large, powerful hooked beak for tearing flesh from their prey, strong legs, powerful talons, and keen eyesight. The family is monotypic.

 Osprey, Pandion haliaetus

Hawks, eagles, and kites

Order: AccipitriformesFamily: Accipitridae

Accipitridae is a family of birds of prey and includes hawks, eagles, kites, harriers, and Old World vultures. These birds have very large powerful hooked beaks for tearing flesh from their prey, strong legs, powerful talons, and keen eyesight.

 Black-winged kite, Elanus caeruleus (A)
 Bearded vulture, Gypaetus barbatus (A)
 Egyptian vulture, Neophron percnopterus (A)
 European honey-buzzard, Pernis apivorus
 Oriental honey-buzzard, Pernis ptilorhynchus (A)
 Cinereous vulture, Aegypius monachus (A)
 Eurasian griffon, Gyps fulvus (A)
 Short-toed snake-eagle, Circaetus gallicus (A)
 Lesser spotted eagle, Clanga pomarina
 Greater spotted eagle, Clanga clanga
 Booted eagle, Hieraaetus pennatus (A)
 Steppe eagle, Aquila nipalensis (A)
 Imperial eagle, Aquila heliaca (A)
 Golden eagle, Aquila chrysaetos
 Eurasian marsh-harrier, Circus aeruginosus
 Hen harrier, Circus cyaneus
 Pallid harrier, Circus macrourus
 Montagu's harrier, Circus pygargus
 Eurasian sparrowhawk, Accipiter nisus
 Northern goshawk, Accipiter gentilis
 Red kite, Milvus milvus
 Black kite, Milvus migrans
 White-tailed eagle, Haliaeetus albicilla
 Rough-legged hawk, Buteo lagopus
 Common buzzard, Buteo buteo
 Long-legged buzzard, Buteo rufinus (A)

Barn-owls
Order: StrigiformesFamily: Tytonidae

Barn-owls are medium to large owls with large heads and characteristic heart-shaped faces. They have long strong legs with powerful talons.

 Barn owl, Tyto alba

Owls

Order: StrigiformesFamily: Strigidae

Typical owls are small to large solitary nocturnal birds of prey. They have large forward-facing eyes and ears, a hawk-like beak, and a conspicuous circle of feathers around each eye called a facial disk.

 Eurasian scops-owl, Otus scops (A)
 Eurasian eagle-owl, Bubo bubo
 Snowy owl, Bubo scandiacus
 Northern hawk owl, Surnia ulula
 Eurasian pygmy-owl, Glaucidium passerinum
 Little owl, Athene noctua (A)
 Tawny owl, Strix aluco
 Ural owl, Strix uralensis
 Great gray owl, Strix nebulosa
 Long-eared owl, Asio otus
 Short-eared owl, Asio flammeus
 Boreal owl, Aegolius funereus

Hoopoes
Order: BucerotiformesFamily: Upupidae

Hoopoes have black, white and orangey-pink coloring with a large erectile crest on their head.

 Eurasian hoopoe, Upupa epops

Kingfishers
Order: CoraciiformesFamily: Alcedinidae

Kingfishers are medium-sized birds with large heads, long, pointed bills, short legs and stubby tails.

 Common kingfisher, Alcedo atthis

Bee-eaters
Order: CoraciiformesFamily: Meropidae

The bee-eaters are a group of near passerine birds in the family Meropidae. Most species are found in Africa but others occur in southern Europe, Madagascar, Australia and New Guinea. They are characterized by richly colored plumage, slender bodies and usually elongated central tail feathers. All are colourful and have long downturned bills and pointed wings, which give them a swallow-like appearance when seen from afar.

 Blue-cheeked bee-eater, Merops persicus (A)
 European bee-eater, Merops apiaster

Rollers
Order: CoraciiformesFamily: Coraciidae

Rollers resemble crows in size and build, but are more closely related to the kingfishers and bee-eaters. They share the colourful appearance of those groups with blues and browns predominating. The two inner front toes are connected, but the outer toe is not.

 European roller, Coracias garrulus (extirpated)

Woodpeckers

Order: PiciformesFamily: Picidae

Woodpeckers are small to medium-sized birds with chisel-like beaks, short legs, stiff tails and long tongues used for capturing insects. Some species have feet with two toes pointing forward and two backward, while several species have only three toes. Many woodpeckers have the habit of tapping noisily on tree trunks with their beaks.

 Eurasian wryneck, Jynx torquilla
 Eurasian three-toed woodpecker, Picoides tridactylus
 Middle spotted woodpecker, Dendrocoptes medius (A)
 White-backed woodpecker, Dendrocopos leucotos
 Great spotted woodpecker, Dendrocopos major
 Lesser spotted woodpecker, Dryobates minor
 Gray-headed woodpecker, Picus canus
 Eurasian green woodpecker, Picus viridis
 Black woodpecker, Dryocopus martius

Falcons and caracaras

Order: FalconiformesFamily: Falconidae

Falconidae is a family of diurnal birds of prey. They differ from hawks, eagles and kites in that they kill with their beaks instead of their talons.

 Lesser kestrel, Falco naumanni (A)
 Eurasian kestrel, Falco tinnunculus
 Red-footed falcon, Falco vespertinus
 Amur falcon, Falco amurensis (A)
 Eleonora's falcon, Falco eleonorae (A)
 Merlin, Falco columbarius
 Eurasian hobby, Falco subbuteo
 Saker falcon, Falco cherrug (A)
 Gyrfalcon, Falco rusticolus
 Peregrine falcon, Falco peregrinus

Old World orioles
Order: PasseriformesFamily: Oriolidae

The Old World orioles are colourful passerine birds. They are not related to the New World orioles.

 Eurasian golden oriole, Oriolus oriolus

Shrikes
Order: PasseriformesFamily: Laniidae

Shrikes are passerine birds known for their habit of catching other birds and small animals and impaling the uneaten portions of their bodies on thorns. A shrike's beak is hooked, like that of a typical bird of prey.

 Red-backed shrike, Lanius collurio
 Red-tailed shrike, Lanius phoenicuroides (A)
 Isabelline shrike, Lanius isabellinus (A)
 Brown shrike, Lanius cristatus (A)
 Long-tailed shrike, Lanius schach (A)
 Northern shrike, Lanius borealis (A)
 Great gray shrike, Lanius excubitor
 Lesser gray shrike, Lanius minor
 Masked shrike, Lanius nubicus (A)
 Woodchat shrike, Lanius senator (A)

Crows, jays, and magpies

Order: PasseriformesFamily: Corvidae

The family Corvidae includes crows, ravens, jays, choughs, magpies, treepies, nutcrackers, and ground jays. Corvids are above average in size among the Passeriformes, and some of the larger species show high levels of intelligence.

 Siberian jay, Perisoreus infaustus
 Eurasian jay, Garrulus glandarius
 Eurasian magpie, Pica pica
 Eurasian nutcracker, Nucifraga caryocatactes
 Yellow-billed chough, Pyrrhocorax graculus (A)
 Eurasian jackdaw, Corvus monedula
 Daurian jackdaw, Corvus dauuricus (A)
 Rook, Corvus frugilegus
 Carrion crow, Corvus corone
 Hooded crow, Corvus cornix
 Common raven, Corvus corax

Tits, chickadees, and titmice

Order: PasseriformesFamily: Paridae

The Paridae are mainly small stocky woodland species with short stout bills. Some have crests. They are adaptable birds, with a mixed diet including seeds and insects.

 Coal tit, Periparus ater
 Crested tit, Lophophanes cristatus
 Marsh tit, Poecile palustris
 Willow tit, Poecile montanus
 Gray-headed chickadee, Poecile cinctus
 Eurasian blue tit, Cyanistes caeruleus
 Azure tit, Cyanistes cyanus (A)
 Great tit, Parus major

Penduline-tits
Order: PasseriformesFamily: Remizidae

The penduline-tits are a group of small passerine birds related to the true tits. They are insectivores.

 Eurasian penduline-tit, Remiz pendulinus

Larks

Order: PasseriformesFamily: Alaudidae

Larks are small terrestrial birds with often extravagant songs and display flights. Most larks are fairly dull in appearance. Their food is insects and seed

 Horned lark, Eremophila alpestris
 Greater short-toed lark, Calandrella brachydactyla (A)
 Bimaculated lark, Melanocorypha bimaculata (A)
 Calandra lark, Melanocorypha calandra (A)
 Black lark, Melanocorypha yeltoniensis (A)
 Mediterranean short-toed lark, Alaudala rufescens (A)
 Wood lark, Lullula arborea
 White-winged lark, Alauda leucoptera (A)
 Eurasian skylark, Alauda arvensis
 Crested lark, Galerida cristata

Bearded reedling
Order: PasseriformesFamily: Panuridae

This species, the only one in its family, is found in reed beds throughout temperate Europe and Asia.

 Bearded reedling, Panurus biarmicus

Cisticolas and allies
Order: PasseriformesFamily: Cisticolidae

The Cisticolidae are warblers found mainly in warmer southern regions of the Old World. They are generally very small birds of drab brown or gray appearance found in open country such as grassland or scrub.

 Zitting cisticola, Cisticola juncidis (A)

Reed warblers and allies
Order: PasseriformesFamily: Acrocephalidae

The members of this family are usually rather large for "warblers". Most are rather plain olivaceous brown above with much yellow to beige below. They are usually found in open woodland, reedbeds, or tall grass. The family occurs mostly in southern to western Eurasia and surroundings, but it also ranges far into the Pacific, with some species in Africa.

 Booted warbler, Iduna caligata (A)
 Sykes's warbler, Iduna rama (A)
 Eastern olivaceous warbler, Iduna pallida (A)
 Western olivaceous warbler, Iduna opaca (A)
 Melodious warbler, Hippolais polyglotta (A)
 Icterine warbler, Hippolais icterina
 Aquatic warbler, Acrocephalus paludicola (A)
 Moustached warbler, Acrocephalus melanopogon (A)
 Sedge warbler, Acrocephalus schoenobaenus
 Paddyfield warbler, Acrocephalus agricola (A)
 Blyth's reed warbler, Acrocephalus dumetorum
 Marsh warbler, Acrocephalus palustris
 Eurasian reed warbler, Acrocephalus scirpaceus
 Great reed warbler, Acrocephalus arundinaceus

Grassbirds and allies
Order: PasseriformesFamily: Locustellidae

Locustellidae are a family of small insectivorous songbirds found mainly in Eurasia, Africa, and the Australian region. They are smallish birds with tails that are usually long and pointed, and tend to be drab brownish or buffy all over.

 Pallas's grasshopper warbler, Helopsaltes certhiola (A)
 Lanceolated warbler, Locustella lanceolata (A)
 River warbler, Locustella fluviatilis
 Savi's warbler, Locustella luscinioides
 Common grasshopper-warbler, Locustella naevia

Swallows

Order: PasseriformesFamily: Hirundinidae

The family Hirundinidae is adapted to aerial feeding. They have a slender streamlined body, long pointed wings, and a short bill with a wide gape. The feet are adapted to perching rather than walking, and the front toes are partially joined at the base.

 Bank swallow, Riparia riparia
 Eurasian crag-martin, Ptyonoprogne rupestris (A)
 Barn swallow, Hirundo rustica
 Red-rumped swallow, Cecropis daurica
 Cliff swallow, Petrochelidon pyrrhonota (A)
 Common house-martin, Delichon urbicum

Leaf warblers
Order: PasseriformesFamily: Phylloscopidae

Leaf warblers are a family of small insectivorous birds found mostly in Eurasia and ranging into Wallacea and Africa. The species are of various sizes, often green-plumaged above and yellow below, or more subdued with grayish-green to grayish-brown colors.

 Wood warbler, Phylloscopus sibilatrix
 Western Bonelli's warbler, Phylloscopus bonelli (A)
 Eastern Bonelli's warbler, Phylloscopus orientalis (A)
 Yellow-browed warbler, Phylloscopus inornatus
 Hume's warbler, Phylloscopus humei
 Pallas's leaf warbler, Phylloscopus proregulus
 Radde's warbler, Phylloscopus schwarzi (A)
 Dusky warbler, Phylloscopus fuscatus 
 Plain leaf warbler, Phylloscopus neglectus (A)
 Willow warbler, Phylloscopus trochilus
 Common chiffchaff, Phylloscopus collybita
 Iberian chiffchaff, Phylloscopus ibericus (A)
 Eastern crowned warbler, Phylloscopus coronatus (A)
 Green warbler, Phylloscopus nitidus (A)
 Greenish warbler, Phylloscopus trochiloides
 Two-barred warbler, Phylloscopus plumbeitarsus (A)
 Arctic warbler, Phylloscopus borealis

Bush warblers and allies
Order: PasseriformesFamily: Scotocercidae

The members of this family are found throughout Africa, Asia, and Polynesia. Their taxonomy is in flux, and some authorities place some genera in other families.

 Cetti's warbler, Cettia cetti (A)

Long-tailed tits
Order: PasseriformesFamily: Aegithalidae

Long-tailed tits are a group of small passerine birds with medium to long tails. They make woven bag nests in trees. Most eat a mixed diet which includes insects.

 Long-tailed tit, Aegithalos caudatus

Sylviid warblers, parrotbills, and allies

Order: PasseriformesFamily: Sylviidae

The family Sylviidae is a group of small insectivorous birds. They mainly occur as breeding species, as another common name (Old World warblers) implies, in Europe, Asia and, to a lesser extent, Africa. Most are of generally undistinguished appearance, but many have distinctive songs.

 Eurasian blackcap, Sylvia atricapilla
 Garden warbler, Sylvia borin
 Barred warbler, Curruca nisoria
 Lesser whitethroat, Curruca curruca
 Asian desert warbler, Curruca nana (A)
 Rüppell's warbler, Curruca ruppeli (A)
 Sardinian warbler, Curruca melanocephala (A)
 Moltoni's warbler, Curruca subalpina (A)
 Western subalpine warbler, Curruca iberiae (A)
 Eastern subalpine warbler, Curruca cantillans (A)
 Greater whitethroat, Curruca communis
 Dartford warbler, Curruca undata (A)

Kinglets
Order: PasseriformesFamily: Regulidae

The kinglets and "crests" are a small family of birds which resemble some warblers. They are very small insectivorous birds in the single genus Regulus. The adults have colored crowns, giving rise to their name.

 Goldcrest, Regulus regulus
 Common firecrest, Regulus ignicapilla

Nuthatches
Order: PasseriformesFamily: Sittidae

Nuthatches are small woodland birds. They have the unusual ability to climb down trees head first, unlike other birds which can only go upwards. Nuthatches have big heads, short tails, and powerful bills and feet.

 Eurasian nuthatch, Sitta europaea

Treecreepers
Order: PasseriformesFamily: Certhiidae

Treecreepers are small woodland birds, brown above and white below. They have thin pointed down-curved bills, which they use to extricate insects from bark. They have stiff tail feathers, like woodpeckers, which they use to support themselves on vertical trees.

 Eurasian treecreeper, Certhia familiaris
 Short-toed treecreeper, Certhia brachydactyla (A)

Wrens
Order: PasseriformesFamily: Troglodytidae

The wrens are mainly small and inconspicuous except for their loud songs. These birds have short wings and thin down-turned bills. Several species often hold their tails upright. All are insectivorous.

 Eurasian wren, Troglodytes troglodytes

Dippers
Order: PasseriformesFamily: Cinclidae

Dippers are a group of perching birds whose habitat includes aquatic environments in the Americas, Europe, and Asia. They are named for their bobbing or dipping movements.

 White-throated dipper, Cinclus cinclus

Starlings
Order: PasseriformesFamily: Sturnidae

Starlings are small to medium-sized passerine birds. Their flight is strong and direct and they are very gregarious. Their preferred habitat is fairly open country. They eat insects and fruit. Their plumage is typically dark with a metallic sheen.

 European starling, Sturnus vulgaris
 Rosy starling, Pastor roseus (A)

Thrushes and allies

Order: PasseriformesFamily: Turdidae

The thrushes are a family of birds that occur mainly in the Old World. They are plump, soft-plumaged, small-to-medium-sized insectivores or sometimes omnivores, often feeding on the ground. Many have attractive songs.

 White's thrush, Zoothera aurea (A)
 Scaly thrush, Zoothera dauma (A)
 Veery, Catharus fuscescens (A)
 Swainson's thrush, Catharus ustulatus (A)
 Hermit thrush, Catharus guttatus (A)
 Siberian thrush, Geokichla sibirica (A)
 Mistle thrush, Turdus viscivorus
 Song thrush, Turdus philomelos
 Redwing, Turdus iliacus
 Eurasian blackbird, Turdus merula
 American robin, Turdus migratorius (A)
 Eyebrowed thrush, Turdus obscurus (A)
 Fieldfare, Turdus pilaris
 Ring ouzel, Turdus torquatus
 Black-throated thrush, Turdus atrogularis (A)
 Red-throated thrush, Turdus ruficollis (A)
 Dusky thrush, Turdus eunomus (A)
 Naumann's thrush, Turdus naumanni (A)

Old World flycatchers

Order: PasseriformesFamily: Muscicapidae

Old World flycatchers are a large group of birds which are mainly small arboreal insectivores. The appearance of these birds is highly varied, but they mostly have weak songs and harsh calls.

 Asian brown flycatcher, Muscicapa latirostris (A)
 Spotted flycatcher, Muscicapa striata
 European robin, Erithacus rubecula
 White-throated robin, Irania gutturalis (A)
 Thrush nightingale, Luscinia luscinia
 Common nightingale, Luscinia megarhynchos (A)
 Bluethroat, Luscinia svecica
 Siberian rubythroat, Calliope calliope (A)
 Red-flanked bluetail, Tarsiger cyanurus (A)
 Taiga flycatcher, Ficedula albicilla (A)
 Red-breasted flycatcher, Ficedula parva
 European pied flycatcher, Ficedula hypoleuca
 Collared flycatcher, Ficedula albicollis
 Common redstart, Phoenicurus phoenicurus
 Black redstart, Phoenicurus ochruros
 Rufous-tailed rock-thrush, Monticola saxatilis (A)
 Blue rock-thrush, Monticola solitarius (A)
 Whinchat, Saxicola rubetra
 European stonechat, Saxicola rubicola
 Siberian stonechat, Saxicola maurus (A)
 Pied bushchat, Saxicola caprata (A)
 Northern wheatear, Oenanthe oenanthe
 Isabelline wheatear, Oenanthe isabellina (A)
 Desert wheatear, Oenanthe deserti (A)
 Western black-eared wheatear, Oenanthe hispanica (A)
 Eastern black-eared wheatear, Oenanthe melanoleuca (A)
 Pied wheatear, Oenanthe pleschanka (A)

Waxwings
Order: PasseriformesFamily: Bombycillidae

The waxwings are a group of birds with soft silky plumage and unique red tips to some of the wing feathers. In the Bohemian and cedar waxwings, these tips look like sealing wax and give the group its name. These are arboreal birds of northern forests. They live on insects in summer and berries in winter.

 Bohemian waxwing, Bombycilla garrulus
 Cedar waxwing, Bombycilla cedrorum (A)

Accentors
Order: PasseriformesFamily: Prunellidae

The accentors are the only bird family which is endemic to the Palearctic. They are small, fairly drab species superficially similar to sparrows.

 Alpine accentor, Prunella collaris (A)
 Siberian accentor, Prunella montanella (A)
 Black-throated accentor, Prunella atrogularis (A)
 Dunnock, Prunella modularis

Old World sparrows

Order: PasseriformesFamily: Passeridae

In general, Old World sparrows tend to be small, plump, brown or gray birds with short tails and short powerful beaks. Sparrows are seed eaters, but they also consume small insects.

 House sparrow, Passer domesticus
 Spanish sparrow, Passer hispaniolensis (A)
 Eurasian tree sparrow, Passer montanus

Wagtails and pipits

Order: PasseriformesFamily: Motacillidae

Motacillidae is a family of small birds with medium to long tails which includes the wagtails, longclaws, and pipits. They are slender ground-feeding insectivores of open country.

 Gray wagtail, Motacilla cinerea
 Western yellow wagtail, Motacilla flava
 Eastern yellow wagtail,Motacilla tschutschensis
 Citrine wagtail, Motacilla citreola
 White wagtail, Motacilla alba
 Richard's pipit, Anthus richardi
 Blyth's pipit, Anthus godlewskii (A)
 Tawny pipit, Anthus campestris
 Meadow pipit, Anthus pratensis
 Tree pipit, Anthus trivialis
 Olive-backed pipit, Anthus hodgsoni (A)
 Pechora pipit, Anthus gustavi (A)
 Red-throated pipit, Anthus cervinus
 Water pipit, Anthus spinoletta
 Rock pipit, Anthus petrosus
 American pipit, Anthus rubescens (A)

Finches, euphonias, and allies

Order: PasseriformesFamily: Fringillidae

Finches are seed-eating birds that are small to moderately large and have a short strong beak, usually conical and in some species very large. All have twelve tail feathers and nine primaries. These birds have a bouncing flight with alternating bouts of flapping and gliding on closed wings, and most sing well.

 Common chaffinch, Fringilla coelebs
 Brambling, Fringilla montifringilla
 Hawfinch, Coccothraustes coccothraustes
 Common rosefinch, Carpodacus erythrinus
 Pine grosbeak, Pinicola enucleator
 Eurasian bullfinch, Pyrrhula pyrrhula
 Trumpeter finch, Bucanetes githagineus (A)
 Mongolian finch, Bucanetes mongolicus (A)
 European greenfinch, Chloris chloris
 Twite, Linaria flavirostris
 Eurasian linnet, Linaria cannabina
 Common redpoll, Acanthis flammea
 Lesser redpoll, Acanthis cabaret
 Hoary redpoll, Acanthis hornemanni
 Parrot crossbill, Loxia pytyopsittacus
 Red crossbill, Loxia curvirostra
 White-winged crossbill, Loxia leucoptera
 European goldfinch, Carduelis carduelis
 European serin, Serinus serinus
 Eurasian siskin, Spinus spinus

Longspurs and snow buntings
Order: PasseriformesFamily: Calcariidae

The Calcariidae are a family of birds that had been traditionally grouped with the New World sparrows, but differ in a number of respects and are usually found in open grassy areas.

 Lapland longspur, Calcarius lapponicus
 Snow bunting, Plectrophenax nivalis

Old World buntings
Order: PasseriformesFamily: Emberizidae

Emberizidae is a family of passerine birds containing a single genus. Until 2017, the New World sparrows (Passerellidae) were also considered part of this family.

 Black-headed bunting, Emberiza melanocephala (A)
 Corn bunting, Emberiza calandra
 Chestnut-eared bunting, Emberiza fucata (A)
 Rock bunting, Emberiza cia (A)
 Cirl bunting, Emberiza cirlus (A)
 Yellowhammer, Emberiza citrinella
 Pine bunting, Emberiza leucocephalos (A)
 Gray-necked bunting, Emberiza buchanani (A)
 Cinereous bunting, Emberiza cineracea (A)
 Ortolan bunting, Emberiza hortulana
 Cretzschmar's bunting, Emberiza caesia (A)
 Pallas's bunting, Emberiza pallasi (A)
 Reed bunting, Emberiza schoeniclus
 Yellow-breasted bunting, Emberiza aureola (A)
 Little bunting, Emberiza pusilla
 Rustic bunting, Emberiza rustica
 Black-faced bunting, Emberiza spodocephala (A)
 Yellow-browed bunting, Emberiza chrysophrys (A)

New World sparrows
Order: PasseriformesFamily: Passerellidae

Until 2017, these species were considered part of the family Emberizidae. Most of the species are known as sparrows, but these birds are not closely related to the Old World sparrows which are in the family Passeridae. Many of these have distinctive head patterns.

 American tree sparrow, Spizelloides arborea (A)
 Dark-eyed junco, Junco hyemalis (A)
 White-throated sparrow, Zonotrichia albicollis (A)
 Song sparrow, Melospiza melodia (A)

Troupials and allies
Order: PasseriformesFamily: Icteridae

The icterids are a group of small to medium-sized, often colorful passerine birds restricted to the New World and include the grackles, New World blackbirds, and New World orioles. Most species have black as a predominant plumage color, often enlivened by yellow, orange, or red.

 Yellow-headed blackbird, Xanthocephalus xanthocephalus
 Baltimore oriole, Icterus galbula (A)

Cardinals and allies
Order: PasseriformesFamily: Cardinalidae

The cardinals are a family of robust seed-eating birds with strong bills. They are typically associated with open woodland. The sexes usually have distinct plumages.

 Rose-breasted grosbeak, Pheucticus ludovicianus (A)

See also
 List of mammals of Sweden
 List of birds
 Lists of birds by region

References

External links
 Birds of Sweden - World Institute for Conservation and Environment

Lists of birds by country
Lists of birds of Europe
Birds
Birds